Madangopal Jiu Temple is a 450 year old Hindu temple in the village of Mellak, near Samta, in Deulti town,in Howrah district, in the Indian state of West Bengal. The temple is locally known as Gopaler Mondir (literally, "the temple of Gopala"). The temple is terracotta ornamented and is built in the aatchala (roof with eight slopes) style.it was commissioned by Mukundaprasad Roychowdhury, a descent of the Roychowdhury zamindars of Mellak, in the 17th-century CE.This temple is near to the traditional house of Bengali writer Sarat Chandra Chattopadhyay. .
The temple was built in 1651 CE by the local Zamindar Mukundaprasad Roychowdhury who was a famous wrestler in this region during those times. The mandir was situated on the banks of the river Rupnarayan, now the river changed its course and has now moved further away. It is the one of the oldest mandir of the district of Howrah and one of the largest Aatchala styled mandir in West Bengal. The temple is now in ruins. Reconstruction work was started in the early 2010 but stopped midway. The idols are being kept, cared for and worshiped by the nearby local family.

In modern times

References

Krishna temples
Hindu temples in West Bengal
Buildings and structures in Howrah district
1651 establishments in the Mughal Empire
Tourist attractions in Howrah district